Sergei Semyonovich Shakhrai (born 28 June 1958) is a Russian retired pair skater. With partner Marina Cherkasova, he is the 1980 Olympic silver medalist, 1980 World champion, and 1979 European champion.

Career 
Cherkasova and Shakhrai trained in Moscow with Stanislav Zhuk. Their main rivals included fellow Soviets Irina Rodnina / Alexander Zaitsev, whom they never defeated, Irina Vorobieva / Igor Lisovsky, Marina Pestova / Stanislav Leonovich, and Veronika Pershina / Marat Akbarov.

Cherkasova and Shakhrai were 12 and 18 respectively when they were paired together. Initially, there was a 35 cm height difference between the pair, with Cherkasova only 138 cm tall.

With his 12-year-old partner, he won the bronze at their first European Championship in 1977. Their height difference facilitated innovation in twist and lift elements; they became the first pair to perform the split quadruple twist in 1978. Later, the judging standards were changed to value physical harmony between the partners, which handicapped the pair.

They won the European title in 1979. By 1980 Cherkasova had grown 20 cm. The change affected their technical elements, however, the pair managed to win silver at 1980 Europeans, silver at the 1980 Olympics, and gold at Worlds. Cherkasova was only 15 years old when she competed at the Olympics while Shakhrai was 21.

Shakhrai's problems lifting his now 45 kg partner eventually resulted in them splitting up. By 1981, Cherkasova had grown so tall that Shakhrai could no longer effectively lift her. This caused them to miss the medal podium at the World Championship in Hartford, Connecticut, finishing in fourth place. Cherkasova & Shakhrai continued to train for the 1982 season, but eventually broke up. 

He coached the pair of Olga Neizvestnaya & Sergei Hudyakov to a bronze medal at the 1984 World Junior Figure Skating Championships. As of November 2016, Shakhrai was working as an ice skating coach in Australia.

Competitive highlights 
(with Cherkasova)

References

Navigation 

1958 births
Living people
Soviet male pair skaters
Russian male pair skaters
Olympic figure skaters of the Soviet Union
Figure skaters at the 1980 Winter Olympics
Olympic silver medalists for the Soviet Union
Olympic medalists in figure skating
World Figure Skating Championships medalists
European Figure Skating Championships medalists
Medalists at the 1980 Winter Olympics